William Moge (1911 – January 18, 2002) was an American football, basketball and baseball coach. He served as the head coach in all three sports at American International College during the early 1940s.

He later served as the head football coach of the Holyoke Bombers of the Atlantic Coast Football League for part of one season in 1965.

References

1911 births
2002 deaths
American International Yellow Jackets baseball coaches
American International Yellow Jackets football coaches
American International Yellow Jackets men's basketball coaches
Atlantic Coast Football League coaches